The Whorror is the first EP by American metalcore band Motionless in White. It was released on July 3, 2007, through Masquerade Recordings.

Track listing
All songs written by Chris "Motionless" Cerulli. 

Alternate track list

Personnel
Motionless in White
 Chris "Motionless" Cerulli – lead vocals
 Mike Costanza – lead guitar
 Thomas "TJ" Bell – rhythm guitar, co-lead vocals
 Frank Polumbo – bass
 Josh Balz – keyboards, backing vocals
 Angelo Parente – drums

Trivia
"She Never Made It to the Emergency Room" and "Apocolips" were re-recorded for the full-length version of When Love Met Destruction.

A sequel to "Schitzophrenicannibalisticsexfest.com", entitled ".Com Pt. II", was recorded for the album Creatures.

References

2007 debut EPs
Motionless in White albums